The Trenton 150 was an American Championship Car race held at Trenton International Speedway from 1946 until 1979.  In most years, two races were held: one in April, and one in September.  Race lengths varied between 100, 150, 200, or 300 miles.  The first four editions were held on a dirt track.

Race winners

 Non-championship event

External links
Champ Car Stats: Trenton archive
Ultimate Racing History: Trenton archive

American open wheel series races
Champ Car races
Motorsport in New Jersey
Recurring sporting events established in 1946
Recurring sporting events disestablished in 1979
1946 establishments in New Jersey
1979 disestablishments in New Jersey